Trochus fultoni is a species of sea snail, a marine gastropod mollusk in the family Trochidae, the top snails.

Trochus fultoni Melvill, 1898, which is currently in use for a species from the Gulf of Oman is a junior homonym of Trochus fultoni G.B. Sowerby III, 1890 (which has become a synonym of † Jujubinus suarezensis fultoni (G.B. Sowerby III, 1890), described from South Africa.

Description

Distribution
This marine species occurs in the Gulf of Oman and off Kuwait (intertidal zone of Ras Al-Zour).

References

 Bosch D.T., Dance S.P., Moolenbeek R.G. & Oliver P.G. (1995) Seashells of eastern Arabia. Dubai: Motivate Publishing. 296 pp

External links
 

fultoni
Gastropods described in 1898